The Land Transport Authority (LTA) is a statutory board under the Ministry of Transport of the Government of Singapore.

History

Incorporation of Land Transport Authority
Land Transport Authority (LTA) was established on 1 September 1995, formed from the merger of various public sector entities, namely the Registry of Vehicles, Mass Rapid Transit Corporation, Roads & Transportation Division of the Public Works Department and Land Transportation Division of the former Ministry of Communications.

1996 Land Transport White Paper
On 2 January 1996, the Land Transport Authority published the 1996 Land Transport White Paper, titled "A World Class Land Transport System". It outlined the government plans. Changes to existing schemes were proposed along with schemes were introduced across various transport sectors. This included the Electronic Road Pricing (ERP) scheme, which eventually become ubiquitous in the city state.

1996 Rail Financing Framework
The 1996 Rail Financing Framework was a scheme that set out the financing framework of the rail transport system. In the white paper, it was phrased that the financing framework of the rail transport system would eventually be run on the basis of partnership, which the government and its regulatory authority would provide the assets and infrastructure (which remain fully owned by the regulatory authority), with commuters paying for the operating costs and operators extracting efficiency dividends within standards and fares set by the regulatory authority.

The framework allowed for an open up of the rail transport market with the operation aspects of the industry no longer tied to the authorities, allowing for more autonomy of the incumbent operator and new operators to enter the market. This also laid the foundation for the restructure and flotation of SMRT Corporation, previously a state-owned incumbent operator under the name Mass Rapid Transit Corporation, in 2000.

The framework was revised in 2008 as the New Rail Financing Framework (NRFF), which saw the regulatory authority re-assuming the full ownership of all rail assets, where the ownership and maintenance of which were previously held responsible under the individual operators.

Changes to public transport
To meet with the increasing number of commuters in Singapore, Land Transport Authority exercises on new changes over time.

Rail
LTA is responsible for the development of the rapid transit system and the expansion of the rail network. It aims to double the rail network by 2030. Since 2008, LTA has increased the length of Singapore's rail network from 138 km to about 180 km with the opening of the Boon Lay Extension in 2009, the Circle Line from 2009 to 2011 and the Circle Line Extension in 2012. Downtown Line, Thomson-East Coast Line are underway towards completion, with Cross Island Line and Jurong Region Line under planning.

Half-height platform screen doors were installed in all 36 elevated stations in 2012 for the safety of passengers and to reduce delays in train service from track intrusions. HVLS fans are also installed at all elevated stations starting from 1 June 2012 and ending on 6 January 2013.

Bus
LTA took on the role of central bus network planner from 2009, working with communities and the bus operators, SBS Transit and SMRT Buses, to identify areas for bus improvements and to shift the focus to placing the commuter at the centre and taking a holistic approach in planning the bus network, taking into consideration development in the Rapid Transit System (RTS) network and other transport infrastructure. It is meant for their feedbacks, and any changes will be under the monthly updates, this has been brought through Bus Services Enhancement Programme. Under BSEP, about 80 new services are being introduced and 1,000 buses are being added over five years.

Quality of Service (QoS) standards have also been tightened to reduce waiting time and reduce crowding. Now, those with increased loads run every 10 minutes or less during weekday peak hours in 2015. Feeder bus services have become more frequent too, with 95% of bus services now running at intervals of 10 minutes or less during the weekday peak periods, tightened from 85%.

Announced in 2014, the Bus Contracting Model (BCM) which took effect on 1 September 2016, saw LTA assuming the full ownership of all bus assets in Singapore.

Road projects
Investment in road projects ensures that the economy will be ably supported with a strong and ever-improving transport infrastructure and coordinated system. One such project is the introduction of the Parking Guidance System (PGS) in the city and HarbourFront area to guide drivers to the nearest parking facility with available parking spaces, reducing the need for vehicles to cruise around to find empty parking spaces.

As part of investment in road projects, LTA will also be expanding the EMAS signages and upgrading the oldest EMAS signages in the expressways.

To improve road safety, LTA implemented a variety of road engineering measures, such as adding pedestrian crossing lines with enhanced dash markings, traffic calming markings and "pedestrian crossing ahead" road markings in more locations in 2009. "Your Speed Signs", electronic signs displaying the speed of a passing vehicle, were also introduced so that motorists could be more aware of their speeds and would be more likely to keep to the speed limit. Road studs which flash in tandem with the green man signal at traffic junctions were also installed at more locations to alert motorists to stop for crossing pedestrians.

References

External links
 
 Land Transport Masterplan 2013
 ONE.MOTORING – information portal for Singapore motorists
 MyTransport.SG – a portal providing information and eServices for all land transport users
 Pay ERP charges via credit card
 Singapore Public Transport portal
 LTA latest press releases

Transport in Singapore
Statutory boards of the Singapore Government
Intermodal transport authorities
1995 establishments in Singapore
Rail accident investigators
Government agencies established in 1995
Regulation in Singapore